The Duchess Anna Amalia Library (German: Herzogin Anna Amalia Bibliothek) in Weimar, Germany, houses a major collection of German literature and historical documents. In 1991, the tricentennial of its opening to the public, the Ducal Library was renamed for Duchess Anna Amalia. Today, the library is a public research library for literature and art history. The main focus is German literature from the Classical and the late Romantic eras. The library was inscribed on the UNESCO World Heritage List as part of the Classical Weimar site because of its testimony to the global cultural importance of Weimar during the late 18th and early 19th centuries during the Weimar Classicism movement.

In 2004 a fire destroyed the main wing and a substantial part of the collection; restoration of salvaged volumes lasted until 2015.

Contents 
The library contains:

 1,000,000 books
 2,000 medieval and early modern manuscripts
 600 ancestral registers
 10,000 maps
 4,000 musical scores

The research library has approximately 850,000 volumes with collection emphasis on the German literature. Among its special collections is an important Shakespeare collection of approximately 10,000 volumes, as well as a 16th-century Bible connected to Martin Luther.

Building 
The main building is the Green Castle (Grünes Schloss), which had been built between 1562 and 1565. The architect was Nikolaus Gromann.

In 2001, construction began on a new multiple-floor facility to house some 1,000,000 books under the "Square of Democracy" (Platz der Demokratie) between the Music University and the Red and Yellow Castle. In its pre-renovation state, the building had structural flaws which endangered many valuable books and the special collections.

The new development is estimated to have cost €24 million and has an area of 6,300 m². The area is divided into upper and lower floors. The new building would connect the historical library building with the user areas of the reconstructed Red and Yellow Castle. The grand opening of the new complex is slated for February 2005.

History 

Anna Amalia, Duchess of Saxe-Weimar-Eisenach, had the building converted into a library in 1761, and in 1766 arranged for the courtly (hoefische) book collection to be moved into the library. The Duchess, seeking a tutor for her son Duke Carl August, hired Christoph Martin Wieland, an important poet and noted translator of William Shakespeare. Wieland's Shakespeare volumes formed the core of the collection.

From an architectural standpoint, the library is world-famous for its oval Rococo hall featuring a portrait of Grand Duke Carl August.

One of the library's most famous patrons was Johann Wolfgang von Goethe, who worked there from 1797 to 1832. The library also includes the world's largest Faust collection. The Duchess's significant 13,000-volume music collection is also available in the library.

Fire of 2004 

Part of the collection was burned in a fire on 2 September 2004, which destroyed 50,000 volumes of which 12,500 are considered irreplaceable. Another 62,000 volumes were severely damaged. However, some 6,000 historical works were saved, including the 1534 Luther Bible and a collection of Alexander von Humboldt's papers, by being passed from hand to hand out of the building. Some 28,000 books in the building were rescued and so not affected by the fire. Other items, like Friedrich Schiller's death mask, suffered damage too, and 35 historic oil paintings were destroyed.

The fire came as a particular tragedy, in part because the collection was scheduled to move to another site in late October, little more than a month later. Some of the damaged books are being freeze-dried in Leipzig to save them from rotting as a result of water damage. Book restoration was scheduled to last at least until 2015.

In June 2005, it was announced that among the manuscripts that were out of the building at the time of the fire, and thus saved from damage, there was a hitherto undiscovered 1713 aria by Johann Sebastian Bach entitled "Alles mit Gott und nichts ohn' ihn".

The library building was restored for $18.2 million and reopened at the end of October 2007 with some 60,000 volumes. This includes the undamaged books, the first restored books and the replacement volumes  obtained on the international antique book market, from other libraries, or by donation. An online database lists the books the library is still seeking in order to replace volumes it lost.

References

External links

 
Library Goes up in Flames, Destroying Literary Legacy at Deutsche Welle
Rare books in German library fire, BBC, 3 September 2004
German library fire burns precious books, Associated Press via nbcnews.com, 4 September 2004
Literary Treasures Lost in Fire at German Library, The New York Times, 4 September 2004
German Library to Reopen, The New York Times, 3 October 2007
Muslim Librarians Visit Germany: The Catalogues of the Queen of Sheba, qantara.de, 29 April 2009
360° Flash-Panoramas: 2004: before the fire, 2004: after the fire

Houses completed in 1565
Research libraries in Germany
Education in Weimar
Buildings and structures in Weimar
Culture in Weimar
2004 fires in Europe
Library fires
Classical Weimar World Heritage Site
1766 establishments in the Holy Roman Empire
Libraries established in 1766